This is a list of United States national Golden Gloves champions in the flyweight division, along with the state or region they represented.

1928 – Jimmy Chase – Chicago
1929 – Jimmy Chase – Chicago
1930 – Joe Espanoza – Chicago
1931 – Leo Rodak – Chicago
1932 – Albert Soukup – Chicago
1933 – Johnny Baltzer – Davenport
1934 – Jesse Levels – Cleveland
1935 – Patsy Urso – Detroit
1936 – Jackie Wilson – Cleveland
1937 – Jimmy Urso – Detroit
1938 – Kenny Lottman – Peoria
1939 – Vic Saccoia – Detroit
1940 – Harold Dade – Chicago
1941 – Harold Dade – Chicago
1942 – Henry Ulrich – Des Moines, Iowa
1943 – Barry Darby – Oklahoma City
1944 – Tom Nate – Gary, Indiana
1945 – Jackie Boyd – Chicago
1946 – Keith Nuttall – Kansas City
1947 – Robert Holliday – Cincinnati
1948 – Robert Holliday – Cincinnati
1949 – Arthur Brown – Kansas City
1950 – Nate Brooks – Cleveland
1951 – Pat Riley – Fort Worth
1952 – Kenneth Wright – Gary, Indiana
1953 – Pete Melendez – Fort Worth
1954 – Bernard Dean – St. Louis
1955 – Tommy Reynolds – St. Louis
1956 – Pete Melendez – Fort Worth
1957 – Jimmy Jackson – Minneapolis
1958 – Gil Yanez – Toledo
1959 – Gil Yanez – Toledo
1960 – Humberto Barrera – Fort Worth
1961 – Chico Marquez – Fort Worth
1962 – Ray Jutrus – Lowell, MA
1963 – Freddie Garcia – Roswell, NM
1964 – Donnie Broadway – Nashville
1965 – Rolland Miller – Minneapolis
1966 – Nickey Priola – Lafayette
1967 – Roland Miller – Minneapolis
1968 – Rudy Barrientes – Fort Worth
1969 – Tony Moreno – Fort Worth
1970 – Tony Moreno – Fort Worth
1971 – James Martinez – Fort Worth
1972 – Greg Lewis – Cincinnati
1973 – Miguel Ayala – Fort Worth
1974 – Greg Richardson – Cleveland1975
Curtis Nicholson 
1975 – Leo Randolph – Rocky Mountain
1075 Curtis Nicholson Nashville [MiddleTennessee]
1976 – Julio Rodrigues – Hawaii
1977 – Orlando Maldonado – Miami
1978 – William Johnson – Washington, D.C.
1979 – Jerome Coffee – Knoxville
1980 – Jerome Coffee – Knoxville
1981 – Ronnie Rentz – New Mexico
1982 – Jesse Benavidez – Fort Worth
1983 – Todd Hickman – Cleveland
1984 – Les Fabri – Las Vegas
1985 – Johnny Tapia – New Mexico
1986 – Anthony Wilson – Washington, DC
1987 – Carl Daniels – St. Louis
1988 – Jesse Medina – Rocky Mountain
1989 – Sandlanner Lewis – Florida
1990 – Timmy Austin – Cincinnati
1991 – Timmy Austin – Cincinnati
1992 – Aristead Clayton, Jr. – Louisiana
1993 – Carlos Navarro – So. California
1994 – Floyd Mayweather – Michigan
1995 – Kelly Wright – St. Louis
1996 – Luis Deines Pérez – Chicago
1997 – Roberto Benitez – Milwaukee
1998 – Gerald Tucker – Cincinnati
1999 – Robert Benitez – Wisconsin
2000 – Calvin Stewart –Atlanta, Ga
2001 – Francisco Rodriguez – .
2002 – Ron Siler – Cincinnati
2003 – Ron Siler – Cincinnati
2004 – Teon Kennedy – Pennsylvania
2005 – Barry Dennis – St. Louis
2006 – Aaron Alafa – California
2007 – Calvin Traxler – Grand Rapids, Michigan
2008 – Jorge Abiague – Portland, Maine
2009 – Louie Byrd – Denver, CO
2010 – Rau'shee Warren – Cincinnati
2011 – Louie Byrd – Denver, CO
2012 - Shawn Simpson - Chicago

2013 – Stephen Fulton – Philadelphia
2014 – Antonio Vargas – Houston
2015 - Antonio Vargas - Houston
2016 - Diego Alvarez - Utah
2017 - Derry Noble - California

References

Golden Gloves